Mounamelanoyi is a 2002 Indian Telugu-language romantic drama film directed by Shyam Prasad and starring Sachiin J. Joshi and Sampada Vaze. The film's title is based on the song of the same name from Sagara Sangamam (1983).

Cast 

Sachiin J. Joshi as Bobby
Sampada Vaze as Mounika
Devan as Mounika's father
Chalapathi Rao as Mounika's uncle
Tanikella Bharani as Mounika's uncle
Sivaji Raja as Mounika's uncle
Kavitha as Mounika's mother
Annapurna as Mounika's aunt
Delhi Rajeswari as Mounika's aunt
Sri Lakshmi as Mounika's aunt 
Saraswathamma as Mounika's grandmother
M. S. Narayana as Lecturer
Ali as Srinu
Babloo as Bobby's friend
Aditi Govitrikar (special appearance in the song "Dancheti Ammalakkalalo")
Rajyalakshmi Roy (special appearance in the song "Idi Benaras")

Production 
Sachiin J. Joshi made his debut with this film. He landed the role through producer Hamid Bhai. To learn his dialogues, Sachin wrote his dialogues in English.

Soundtrack

Reception 
A critic from The Hindu wrote that "Shyamprasad handles the subject well by making the visuals speak for themselves". A critic from Full Hyderabad wrote that "The direction is decent enough as the movie manages to pull through despite the maddening silence".

References